1200 Fifth, formerly the IBM Building, is a 20-story office building in the Metropolitan Tract, part of downtown Seattle, Washington. The building was designed by Minoru Yamasaki, who also was architect of Rainier Tower on the corner diagonally opposite, and the World Trade Center in New York City. Construction on the building began in May 1963 and it was completed in October 1964.

Nard Jones wrote in 1972 that "There is an architectural poetry about [the building] that is at variance with the endless jibes at computerization and the alleged sober pragmatism of IBM personnel."

The corner of the complex at 5th Avenue and University Street was the site of the Seattle Ice Arena from 1915 to 1963.

References

External links
 
 Building profile at Unico Properties

Downtown Seattle
Office buildings in Seattle
Skyscraper office buildings in Seattle
Minoru Yamasaki buildings
NBBJ buildings
Office buildings completed in 1964
1963 establishments in Washington (state)